Cheshmeh Gandab may refer to:
 Cheshmeh Gandab, Hamadan
 Cheshmeh Gandab, Razavi Khorasan